Arthur Henry Fox Jr. (26 March 1924 – 15 June 1953) was an Australian rules footballer who played with South Melbourne in the Victorian Football League (VFL).

The son of Richmond Football Club player Arthur Fox, Sr., Fox arrived in Melbourne from Red Cliffs. His best season came in 1949 when he played 18 of a possible 19 games for South Melbourne. A wingman, he was selected to represent the VFL interstate team that year in Adelaide.

Once his time at South Melbourne ended he returned to Red Cliffs as coach for two seasons, in 1951 and 1952. He joined Wimmera Football League club Rupanyup in 1953 but his time with them was short. On 16 June 1953, Fox was driving from Rupanyup on the Calder Highway when he crashed his motor cycle, near Ouyen. He was rushed to a hospital in Mildura but never regained consciousness and died aged 29.

References
 Hillier, K. (2004) Like Father Like Son, Pennon Publishing, Melbourne. .

Sources

1924 births
1953 deaths
Sydney Swans players
Rupanyup Football Club players
Australian rules footballers from Victoria (Australia)
Road incident deaths in Victoria (Australia)
Motorcycle road incident deaths
Royal Australian Air Force personnel of World War II
Royal Australian Air Force airmen